Herbert "Champ" Cooper was a Negro league first baseman in the 1910s.

Cooper made his Negro leagues debut in 1913 with the Cuban Giants. He went on to play for several teams, finishing his career with the Lincoln Giants in 1917 and 1918.

References

External links
  and Seamheads

Place of birth missing
Place of death missing
Year of birth missing
Year of death missing
Chicago American Giants players
Cuban Giants players
Lincoln Giants players
Lincoln Stars (baseball) players
Louisville White Sox (1914-1915) players
Philadelphia Giants players
Schenectady Mohawk Giants players
Baseball first basemen